Kyle Zajec (born March 28, 1997) is an American soccer player who most recently played as a midfielder.

Career

Early career
Zajec started his career with the New York Red Bulls academy when he was 13. After an impressive academy career, Zajec verbally committed to join the Georgetown University Hoyas in 2015. In his four season with the Hoyas, Zajec appeared in 62 matches and scored five goals. During his college years, Zajec also played for New York Red Bulls U-23.

Professional
On March 27, 2015, it was announced that Zajec had signed an amateur agreement to play for the New York Red Bulls II of the United Soccer League. The deal would allow him to play competitive soccer in a professional league without losing his college eligibility. On March 28, 2015, Zajec made his debut for Red Bulls II against Rochester Rhinos. He started and played the whole match as the Red Bulls II drew 0–0. 

On March 8, 2019, Zajec signed his first professional contract with New York Red Bulls II. On May 31, 2019, Zajec scored his first two goals as a professional in a 4-0 victory over Bethlehem Steel FC.

Following the 2021 season, Zajec's contract option was declined by New York.

Career statistics

References

External links

 Georgetown profile
 New York Red Bulls II profile
 
 
 

1997 births
Living people
American soccer players
Soccer players from Connecticut
Sportspeople from Fairfield County, Connecticut
People from Westport, Connecticut
Association football midfielders
New York Red Bulls players
Georgetown Hoyas men's soccer players
New York Red Bulls II players
New York Red Bulls U-23 players
USL Championship players
USL League Two players